Danilo Leandro Dias (born 6 November 1985) is a Brazilian professional footballer who plays for Portuguese club SC Mirandela as a forward.

Club career
Born in Ceres, Goiás, Dias spent most of his career in his country in the lower leagues. His Série A input consisted of eight games for Goiás, in the 2005 season.

In June 2010, Dias moved abroad and joined a host of compatriots at C.S. Marítimo. He scored in only his third official appearance, contributing to an 8–2 home demolition of Bangor City for the third qualifying round of the UEFA Europa League, and added another goal until the end of the campaign in the Portuguese League Cup.

Danilo netted eight times while playing all 30 Primeira Liga games in 2011–12, helping the Madeirans finish fifth and once again qualify to the Europa League. On 30 May 2014 he moved to the Azerbaijan Premier League, signing a two-year contract with Qarabağ FK.

Danilo returned to both Portugal and the island of Madeira in August 2015, joining C.F. União.

Club statistics

References

External links

1985 births
Living people
Brazilian footballers
Association football forwards
Campeonato Brasileiro Série A players
Campeonato Brasileiro Série B players
Goiás Esporte Clube players
Sociedade Esportiva do Gama players
Atlético Clube Goianiense players
Goiânia Esporte Clube players
Esporte Clube Noroeste players
Ipatinga Futebol Clube players
Uberaba Sport Club players
América Futebol Clube (MG) players
Primeira Liga players
Liga Portugal 2 players
Segunda Divisão players
C.S. Marítimo players
C.F. União players
C.D. Cova da Piedade players
SC Mirandela players
Azerbaijan Premier League players
Qarabağ FK players
Brazilian expatriate footballers
Expatriate footballers in Portugal
Expatriate footballers in Azerbaijan
Brazilian expatriate sportspeople in Portugal
Brazilian expatriate sportspeople in Azerbaijan